Ushijimaella is a genus of beetles in the family Carabidae.

Species
The genus contains the following species:

 Ushijimaella lucida Belousov & Kabak, 2002
 Ushijimaella pilosistriata Ueno, 1980
 Ushijimaella silvatica P. Moravec & Wrase, 1998
 Ushijimaella uenoi P. Moravac & Wrase, 1998

References

Trechinae